17 Musicians in Search of a Sound: Darfur is a live album by American jazz trumpeter Bill Dixon. The project, a tour de force of orchestral composition, conduction and improvisational exploration, was specially commissioned by Arts for Art, recorded at the 2007 Vision Festival and released on AUM Fidelity.

Reception

In his review for AllMusic, Michael G. Nastos stated: "this is not an angry or disgusted expressionistic music, but one that reflects the distant outcries of the people in Darfur who need help from the world community... This is a project of austere emotion, clever counterpoint, and searing reality in dedication to a condition in the so-called civilized world that should never, ever be."

Writing for All About Jazz, John Sharpe remarked: "Trumpeter Bill Dixon works with an orchestral conception, even when playing solo, so it is fascinating to hear what happens when he has 17 musicians at his disposal...  it is hard to think who else could deploy such forces to such deft effect, creating a towering work in a class of its own." In a separate review for All About Jazz, Mark Corroto wrote: "Dixon was given talent but little time for rehearsal and changes. This makes for a part composed, part improvised series of passages. There's the feeling that Dixon is guiding this who's who of creative players, but at other times they are free to fill in as their own muse dictates. The music is, nonetheless, up to Dixon's standards. Players create moods for his vast open landscape of a vision, crafting solos in between caverns of sound... 17 Musicians In Search Of A Sound has the feel of a coarse-sewn rug, made from very fine materials. Given time and perhaps a long tour... this music might become tighter and more easily consumable. But, then again, it wouldn't be Bill Dixon music." Nic Jones, in another All About Jazz review, stated: "It's clear, on something like In Search Of A Sound, that instrumental color must have been one of Dixon's abiding concerns. He summons up static blocks of sound  individual voices in the service of some grim, foreboding end that remains unrealized..." Jones concludes by calling the album "a program of music designed not for comfort listening but for challenging and, perhaps, raging against mortality and the horrors and restrictions it imposes."

Joe Tangari, writing for Pitchfork, commented: "From a listener's standpoint, the project's tonal and textural variety and relatively simple organization makes it more approachable than a great deal of free music for newcomers to the genre, though it still takes a willingness to abandon usual structures. In fact, for its flow from violence to calm and back, it bears as much similarity to modern chamber works like Olivier Messiaen's 'Quartet for the End of Time' as it does to Albert Ayler, Cecil Taylor and other free jazz luminaries. Whatever the associates, though, Dixon has created an outstanding work of modern jazz and political commentary."

Track listing
All compositions by Bill Dixon
 "Prelude" - 3:07 
 "Intrados" - 3:58
 "In Search of a Sound" - 4:15
 "Contour One" - 1:43
 "Contour Two" - 0:10 
 "Scattering of the Following" - 7:00
 "Darfur" - 5:27
 "Contour Three" - 3:14
 "Sinopia" - 23:37 
 "Pentimento I" - 0:43
 "Pentimento II" - 0:17
 "Pentimento III" - 0:22
 "Pentimento IV" - 2:41

Personnel
Bill Dixon - trumpet
Graham Haynes, Stephen Haynes, Taylor Ho Bynum - cornet, flugelhorn
Dick Griffin, Steve Swell - trombone
Joseph Daley - tuba
Karen Borca - bassoon
Will Connell - bass clarinet
Michel Cote - contrabass clarinet
Andrew Raffo Dewar - soprano sax
John Hagen - tenor sax, baritone sax
J.D. Parran - bass sax, bamboo flute
Andrew Lafkas - bass
Glynis Loman - cello
Jackson Krall - drums, percussion
Warren Smith - vibraphone, tympani, drums

References

2008 live albums
Bill Dixon live albums
AUM Fidelity live albums
Albums recorded at the Vision Festival